J. B. Judkins may refer to:

J. B. Judkins (politician), lawyer and state senator in Arkansas
John B Judkins Company, carriage and automobile body manufacturing company